Shaked (lit. Almond) is a secular Israeli settlement in the northern West Bank. Located near the Green Line, it is organised as a community settlement and falls under the jurisdiction of Shomron Regional Council.

The international community considers Israeli settlements in the West Bank illegal under international law, but the Israeli government disputes this.

History
The settlement was established in June 1981 by the Mishkei Herut Beitar organization, after the first ten homes were complete. It was named for the wild almond trees that grow in the area.

In 2006, Israeli Defense Minister Shaul Mofaz cited Shaked as one of the settlements that would be included in Israel's final borders under a peace plan with the Palestinians.

In 2011, a resident of Shaked, 15-year-old Shahar Sagi, won a silver medal in the Loralux international judo competition in Luxembourg.

References

External links
Official website  

Israeli settlements in the West Bank
Populated places established in 1981
1981 establishments in the Israeli Military Governorate